An attract-kill pattern is an interaction between plant roots and pathogen, which plays an important role in suppression of Phytophthora disease in intercropping systems. The recent research from Key Laboratory of Agro-Biodiversity and Pest Management of Education Ministry of China indicated that maize roots attracted the zoospores of Phytophthora capsici and inhibited their motility. Then a large amount of cystospores closed to maize roots were lysed. The phenomenon has been widely found in various interactions between roots of non-host plant and Phytophthora.

The attract-kill phenomenon is used in pest management and eradication of invasive species. This method is highly effective in controlling small, low-density, isolated populations. Thus, it is compelling for long-term pest management.

References

 Li C, He X, Zhu S, et al. Crop diversity for yield increase[J]. PLoS ONE, 2009, 4(11):e8049.
 Li X, Wang X, Dai C, et al. Effects of intercropping with Atractylodes lancea and application of bio-organic fertiliser on soil invertebrates, disease control and peanut productivity in continuous peanut cropping field in subtropical China[J]. Agroforestry systems, 2014, 88(1): 41-52.
 Yang M, Zhang Y, Qi L, et al. Plant-plant-microbe mechanisms involved in soil-borne disease suppression on a maize and pepper intercropping system[J]. PLoS ONE, 2014,9(12): e115052.
 Ding X, Yang M, Huang H, et al. Priming maize resistance by its neighbors: activating 1,4-benzoxazine-3-ones synthesis and defense gene expression to alleviate leaf disease[J]. Frontiers in Plant Science, 2015, 6.
 El-Sayed, A. M., D. M. Suckling, J. A. Byers, E. B. Jang, and C. H. Wearing. 2009. “Potential of ‘Lure and Kill’ in Long-Term Pest Management and Eradication of Invasive Species.” Journal of Economic Entomology 102 (3): 815–35. .

Plant ecology
Maize diseases
Phytophthora
Phytopathology